Kamga is a surname. Notable people with the surname include:

Aurélie Kamga (born 1985), French sprinter
Joseph Kamga (born 1953), Cameroonian footballer
Maurice Kamga, lawyer
Vanessa Kamga (born 1998), Swedish athlete

Surnames of African origin